Gazeley Mill is a tower mill at Gazeley, Suffolk, England which has been converted to residential accommodation.

History

Gazeley Mill was built in 1837 by William Death, replacing a nearby post mill. The mill drove five pairs of millstones. A Gippeswyck oil engine was installed by Turners, the Soham millwrights in 1880. In 1893, a one-and-a-half-sack roller mill made by Messrs E R & F Turner of Ipswich was installed. This was driven by the oil engine, which could also drive three of the five pairs of millstones. The mill ceased work c.1920 and was stripped of machinery and house converted in 1947.

Description

Gazeley Mill is a six storey tower mill. It had a boat shaped cap  with a gallery, winded by a fantail. The four Patent sails drove five pairs of millstones.

Millers
William Death 1844–93
R J Harvey 1893–1910

References

Windmills in Suffolk
Tower mills in the United Kingdom
Windmills completed in 1837
Grinding mills in the United Kingdom
Gazeley